"Love Someone" is a song written and recorded by American country music singer Brett Eldredge for his self-titled third studio album (2017). Ross Copperman and Heather Morgan co-wrote the song, while Copperman co-produced the song with Eldredge. "Love Someone" was serviced to American country radio on June 18, 2018 through Atlantic Records and Warner Music Nashville as the third official single from Brett Eldredge.

Music videos
The first official video was released in August 2018 and contains footage of Eldredge performing in concerts filmed during his The Long Way Tour in 2018. He also released another video a month later titled "Love Someone (The Edgar Cut)". The music video features Eldredge's dog named Edgar and shows them doing things together including having a candlelit steak dinner, and riding in a motorcycle and sidecar.

Charts

Weekly charts

Year-end charts

Certifications

References

2017 songs
2018 singles
Brett Eldredge songs
Atlantic Records singles
Songs written by Brett Eldredge
Songs written by Ross Copperman
Song recordings produced by Ross Copperman
Songs written by Heather Morgan (songwriter)